Adesh Singh Chauhan is an Indian politician and a member of the Uttarakhand Legislative Assembly from Jaspur (Uttarakhand Assembly constituency) from the Indian National Congress.
He won the 2017 Uttarakhand Legislative Assembly election from the Indian National Congress and formerly served as party member for the Bharatiya Janata Party. He was re-elected in 2022.

References

Living people
Indian National Congress politicians from Uttarakhand
Place of birth missing (living people)
Bharatiya Janata Party politicians from Uttarakhand
1976 births
Uttarakhand MLAs 2022–2027